, also known as  was a feudal domain under the Tokugawa shogunate of Edo period Japan, located in Hitachi Province (modern-day Ibaraki Prefecture), Japan. It was centered on Matsuoka Castle in what is now the city of Takahagi, Ibaraki.  With the exception of its first twenty years, was ruled by the Nakayama clan.

History
Following the Battle of Sekigahara, in 1600, Tokugawa Ieyasu shifted the Satake clan from its ancestral territories in Hitachi Province to Dewa Province in northern Japan.  In 1602, he awarded a portion of the former Satake lands to Tozawa Masamori, marking the start of Matsuoka Domain. He served in a number of important posts within the administration of the Tokugawa shogunate, and was subsequently transferred to Shinjō Domain in Dewa Province in 1622. Matsuoka Domain was divided, with 30,000 koku going to Mito Domain and 10,000 koku to Tanagura Domain.

In 1646, the hereditary karō of Mito Domain, Nakayama Nobumasa, established his residence at Matsuoka. His son, Nakayama Nobuyoshi was confirmed under Tokugawa Yorifusa, to have holdings of 20,000 koku as a subsidiary domain of Mito Domain.

His descendants continued to reside at Ōta until the time of the 10th daimyō, Nakayama Nobutaka, who returned the seat of the clan back to Matsuoka. During the Boshin War, the 14th daimyō, Nakayama Nobuaki, sided with the pro-Imperial forces, and after the Meiji restoration in 1868, Matsuoka Domain was finally recognized as independent of Mito Domain. The following year, the position of daimyō was abolished, and Nakayama Nobuaki became domain governor until retiring from public life with the abolition of the han system in 1871. His son Nobuzane would be created the first Baron Nakayama during the conversion of the old feudal titles to kazoku peerage in 1884. 

The domain had a total population of 12,805 people in 2842 households per a census in 1869.

Holdings at the end of the Edo period
Unlike  most domains in the han system, Matsuoka Domain consisted of a single territory calculated to provide the assigned kokudaka, based on periodic cadastral surveys and projected agricultural yields. 

Hitachi Province
29 villages in Taga District

List of daimyō

References

External links
  Matsuoka  on "Edo 300 HTML"

Notes

Domains of Japan
1871 disestablishments in Japan
States and territories disestablished in 1871
Hitachi Province
History of Ibaraki Prefecture